

Alexander Georgyevich Spirkin (24 December 1918– 28 June 2004) was a Soviet and Russian philosopher and psychologist. He was born in Saratov Governorate and graduated from the Moscow State Pedagogical University. In 1959 he received his doctorate in philosophy for a dissertation on the origin of consciousness.

He became a professor in 1970, and a year later was elected vice-president of the USSR Philosophical Society. On November 26, 1974, Alexander Spirkin became a Corresponding Member of the USSR Academy of Sciences.

His principal works deal with the problems of consciousness and self-consciousness, worldview, and the subject matter, structure and functions of philosophy. Prof. Spirkin's Fundamentals of Philosophy (1988; English translation 1990) expounding Marxist–Leninist philosophy in popular form was awarded a prize at a competition of textbooks for students of higher educational establishments.

Works (in English)

See also 
 Philosophy in the Soviet Union
 Dialectical materialism
 Historical materialism

References

External links 
 A.G. Spirkin’s profile at the website of the Russian Academy of Sciences 
 Download A.G. Spirkin Fundamentals of Philosophy in DjVu and other formats from Internet Archive

1918 births
2004 deaths
Soviet philosophers
20th-century Russian philosophers
Corresponding Members of the USSR Academy of Sciences
Corresponding Members of the Russian Academy of Sciences
Communist Party of the Soviet Union members

Soviet psychologists
Russian psychologists